The Royal Commission for the Exhibition of 1851 is an institution founded in 1850 to administer the Great Exhibition of the Works of Industry of all Nations, which was held in The Crystal Palace, London.

The founding President of the Commission was Prince Albert of Saxe-Coburg and Gotha and its chief administrator was Henry Cole. The current President is Anne, Princess Royal.

An unusual decision was made to maintain the Royal Commission as a permanent administrative body and to use the profits for charitable purposes. Its revised Charter charged the Commission with "increasing the means of industrial education, and extending the influence of science and art upon productive industry".

South Kensington
The area was then developed as a centre for educational and cultural institutions, often known as "Albertopolis". These include:

 Imperial College
 the Natural History Museum
 the Royal Albert Hall
 the Royal College of Art
 the Royal College of Music
 the Science Museum
 the Victoria and Albert Museum

The Commission's headquarters are in Imperial College.

Since 1891 the role of the Commission has been to provide postgraduate scholarships for students to study in Britain and abroad. Former recipients of scholarships include 13 Nobel Prize laureates.

The Commission currently has capital assets of more than 76 million pounds and makes charitable disbursement of more than two million pounds a year.

References

Further reading
 Hobhouse, Hermione (2002). The Crystal Palace And the Great Exhibition: Science, Art And Productive Industry: The History of the Royal Commission for the Exhibition of 1851. London: Continuum International Publishing Group. .

See also
 1851 Research Fellowship

External links
Royal Commission for the Exhibition of 1851

1850 in London
Organizations established in 1850
1851 in London
Organisations based in London with royal patronage
Royal charities of the United Kingdom
Exhibition of 1851
1850 establishments in the United Kingdom
Albert, Prince Consort
Great Exhibition